Boy Meets Girl may refer to:

Film, television and theatre 
 Boy Meets Girl (play), a 1935 Broadway play by Bella and Samuel Spewack, basis for the 1938 film
 Boy Meets Girl (1938 film), an American film starring James Cagney
 Boy Meets Girl (1982 film), an Israeli film directed by Michal Bat-Adam
 Boy Meets Girl (1984 film), a French film directed by Leos Carax
 Boy Meets Girl (1993 film), an American TV movie starring Jasmine Guy
 Boy Meets Girl (1998 film), a Canadian-American romantic comedy directed by Jerry Ciccoritti, starring Sean Astin
 Boy Meets Girl (2009 TV series), a 2009 UK 4-part TV miniseries (fantasy comedy-drama) starring Rachael Stirling and Martin Freeman 
 Boy Meets Girl (2014 film), an American film about a transgender woman, written and directed by Eric Schaeffer
 Boy Meets Girl (2015 TV series), a UK TV series starring Rebecca Root, Harry Hepple and Denise Welch, and featuring a transgender main character played by a transgender actress.

Literature 
 Boy Meets Girl: Say Hello to Courtship, a 2000 book by Joshua Harris
 Boy Meets Girl (novel), a 2004 novel by Meg Cabot

Music 
 Boy Meets Girl (band), an American pop duo
 Boy Meets Girl (Boy Meets Girl album), 1985
 Boy Meets Girl (Sammy Davis, Jr. and Carmen McRae album), 1957
 Boy Meets Girl (Stroke 9 album), 1993
 Boy Meets Girl (EP), a 2003 EP by Junior Senior
 "Boy Meets Girl" (song), a 1994 song by TRF
 "Boy Meets Girl", a song by Evan Taubenfeld from Welcome to the Blacklist Club
 "Favourite Shirts (Boy Meets Girl)", a song by Haircut 100

See also 
 Boy Meets Girls, a 1950s UK popular music TV show
 Boy Meets Boy (disambiguation)